Vasum elongatum is an extinct species of medium to large sea snail, a marine gastropod mollusk in the family Turbinellidae.

Description
Measurements of the shell: 42.0 x 21.5 mm.

Distribution
Fossils of this marine species have been found in Miocene strata of the Florida, USA. (age range: 20.43 to 15.97 Ma)

References

 E. H. Vokes. 1970. Notes on the fauna of the Chipola Formation - III. Two new species of Vasum (Mollusca: Gastropoda), with comments on Vasum haitense (Sowerby). Tulane Studies in Geology and Paleontology 8(2):88-92

elongatum
Gastropods described in 1970